Dmytro Ihnatenko (also known as Dmitri Ignatenko; born 23 December 1991) is a Ukrainian figure skater. A three-time national medalist, he represented Ukraine at the 2012 European Championships and 2012 World Championships.

Ihnatenko competed until 2014 and then began coaching. In October 2017, he became a coach at a skating club in Prešov, Slovakia.

Programs

Competitive highlights 
JGP: Junior Grand Prix

References

External links 

 Dmitri Ignatenko at the International Skating Union

Ukrainian emigrants to Slovakia
Ukrainian male single skaters
1991 births
Living people
Sportspeople from Dnipro
Competitors at the 2011 Winter Universiade